The following is a list of governmental and public sector scandals in New Zealand. While New Zealand generally scores very well on international indices of corruption, there have been several notable high-profile scandals including cases of cover-ups relating to politics, economics, or public sector debacles, or to the private lives of individual government representatives.

List of scandals

1890s
1892 – Mayor of Wellington Arthur Winton Brown absconds to Australia to escape the consequences of the possible collapse of his businesses.
1898 – Liberal Party MP William Larnach commits suicide in a parliament committee room, the result of impending financial disasters and (reputedly) rumours over a sexual relationship between his wife and her step-son.
1899 – The "Marine Scandal". John Hutcheson fellow MP Frederick Pirani accused Prime Minister Richard Seddon and Minister of Marine William Hall-Jones of using ministerial influence in order to obtain Mariners certificates for unqualified candidates, which was in contravention to the recent Shipping and Seamen's Act. However, the Marine Commission report declared that the charges were unfounded. Hutcheson resigned his seat in order to exonerate himself triggering a by-election, which he won.

1900s

1905 – Francis Fisher, a ringleader of the New Liberal Party caused much controversy in the so-called "voucher incident", in which he alleged that Richard Seddon's son had been received payment from a government department for work he had not done. The allegations were subsequently disproven, and the New Liberals suffered considerable public backlash.

1910s
1918 – MP Paddy Webb is controversially sent to jail for refusing military service.

1920s
1920 – Charles Mackay the Mayor of Wanganui was convicted of the attempted murder of Walter D'Arcy Cresswell, who had been blackmailing Mackay to expose his homosexuality to the public and discredit him.

1930s 

1934 – Sir Āpirana Ngata then Minister of Native Affairs in the United-Reform Coalition government resigns as minister after accusations of departmental maladministration and favouritism were supported by a Royal Commission. 
1935 – Officials from New Zealand's national radio service, at the time part of the New Zealand Post Office, attempt to block a broadcast by the popular Rev. Colin Scrimgeour, fearing that he would advise his listeners to vote for the opposition Labour Party. The Coalition government is implicated, causing a furore.
1938–40 – The Lee Affair: Severe disharmony is caused within the Labour Party by a long running feud between Prime Minister Michael Joseph Savage and senior Labour Party member John A. Lee.

1940s
1941 – The 'Nathan Incident': a scandal developed revolving around Hubert Nathan, a Citizens' Association candidate for the Wellington Harbour Board who was critical of the number of union secretaries on the Labour ticket for the 1941 civic elections. Nathan alleged that 5 unionists used "Gestapo tactics" to try and blackmail him into withdrawing his nomination and accusing them of Antisemitism. The press ran articles on the alleged confrontation (which was refuted by Labour) and as a result no Labour candidates were elected to any of the three local authorities in Wellington until 1950.
1942 – Bert Kyle resigned from the National Party at the climax of a personality feud with leader Sidney Holland. Kyle publicly accused Holland of blackmailing him into becoming a "yes man" or be expelled from the party. Kyle remained an independent MP and retired at the 1943 election.

1950s
1956 – In February 1956, Prime Minister Sidney Holland announced that Dean Eyre, the Minister of Industries and Commerce and Minister of Customs, had been granted six weeks leave in order to attend to private business in Sweden. The Leader of the Opposition, Walter Nash, was critical of the decision. Nash questioned the appropriateness of a minister of the crown conducting his private business abroad. Holland was quick to dismiss any suggestion of impropriety, but was soon to swallow his words. Both The Evening Post and The Dominion (Wellington papers who normally wrote editorials slanted in favour of National) also went on the attack in editorials, urging Holland to reconsider. A surprised Holland reacted quickly and Eyre was forced to cancel his trip, and was stripped of his portfolios and given to Eric Halstead. To ease the situation, Eyre was allocated Halstead's portfolios of Social Security and Tourism instead.
The allegation evolved into a libel case in which Holloway was eventually awarded  in damages and a further  in costs.

1960s
1966 – The Mason Affair: New Labour Party leader Norman Kirk, wishing to rejuvenate the party, puts pressure on Rex Mason and several other elderly MPs to retire. A messy deselection of Mason occurred causing bad publicity for Labour ahead of that years election with several party officeholders in Mason's electorate resigning in protest of his forced retirement.

1970s

1970 – An ugly, public leadership struggle between Vernon Cracknell and his deputy John O'Brien for leadership of the Social Credit Party ended in disaster. It cumulated with brawling between supporters of each candidate with considerable damage done to the party's image. O'Brien was the victor, but his blunt and confrontational style caused him to lose his position after only a short time in office. He then split from Social Credit, founding his own New Democratic Party.
1976 – Fitzgerald v Muldoon: Prime Minister Robert Muldoon advised the Governor-General to abolish Labour's superannuation scheme without new legislation. In the case it was found that revoking a law in such a manner without consent of Parliament was illegal under the Bill of Rights 1689.
1976 – Labour MP Gerald O'Brien is charged with molesting two boys, but the case is thrown out.
1977 – The Moyle Affair:  Muldoon accuses high-ranking Labour Party MP Colin Moyle of having been questioned by the police on suspicion of homosexual activities, at that time illegal in New Zealand. Moyle is forced to resign from parliament.
1977 – Muldoon advised Queen Elizabeth II to appoint Sir Keith Holyoake as Governor-General upon Sir Denis Blundell's term ending. As the Governor-General is a non-partisan position this caused much controversy with Labour leader Bill Rowling criticizing the appointment as cronyism and complaining that he had not been consulted on the appointment, stating he would remove Holyoake should Labour win the 1978 general election.

1980s
1980 – The Marginal Loans Affair: Minister of Agriculture Duncan MacIntyre gave a Marginal Land Boards loan to his daughter and son-in-law for a Wellington property they purchased. A public inquiry later concluded that MacIntyre had not acted willfully improperly, though there were several public resignations of National Party officeholders in MacIntyre's East Cape electorate.
1980 – Former deputy mayor of Lower Hutt, John Seddon, applied for the position of Town Clerk of the Porirua City Council. His appointment, shortly before the 1980 local body elections, triggered enormous controversy, with allegations that it had been a "jack up" by the Labour majority on the Porirua City Council and Seddon's friendship with John Burke. A group of senior Porirua City Council officers jointly signed a letter during the appointment row saying he wasn't the right man for the job as Seddon was not a qualified accountant, the usual prior professional qualification of town clerks at that time, but he had been responsible for managing a company with three times the turnover of the Porirua City Council. Ombudsman Lester Castle was called in to investigate and eventually cleared the appointment process as being sufficiently objective. Following the 1980 elections Labour lost their majority on the council.
1984 – Independent MP John Kirk, the son of former Prime Minister Norman Kirk, absconds, owing more than $280,000. He is arrested in the US, held in prison, and then extradited to New Zealand.
1984 – Following the 1984 general election a constitutional crisis occurred when Muldoon refused to act on instruction of the incoming government, causing a growing currency crisis to worsen. Eventually he relented, after his position as National Party leader was threatened by members of his caucus. Prior to the snap election, Muldoon had announced its date to journalists while being very clearly drunk.
1984 – National Cabinet Minister Keith Allen passed away. Immediately prior to his death Muldoon had refused to accept Allen's resignation from cabinet. Allen found the burdens of holding the office combined with his worsening affliction of diabetes were making his life too stressful. Other National MPs such as Hugh Templeton and Don McKinnon think Muldoon's harsh treatment of Allen contributed significantly to his premature death.
1986 – The Māori loan affair: an unauthorised attempt by the Department of Māori Affairs to raise money overseas for Māori development.

1990s

1992 – Rebel National MP Gilbert Myles instigated a political scandal in September 1992 when he accused former Labour MP Fred Gerbic of operating a graft while he was a minister. Myles, under Parliamentary privilege, alleged that Gerbic took financial donations in exchange for residency approvals in his capacity as associate Minister of Immigration and in support tabled a transcript of an alleged tape recorded conversation between two Auckland Labour Party members. In response Gerbic denied the allegations and maintained his innocence throughout. The claims were investigated by John McGrath QC who, in November 1993, found no evidence of impropriety by Gerbic and dismissed Myles' claims.
1994 – The Winebox Inquiry investigates alleged corruption and incompetence in both the Serious Fraud Office and Inland Revenue Department. The inquiry is instigated after revelations by New Zealand First MP Winston Peters, and named after his habit of keeping the allegation documents in a winebox.
1995–96 – The "Antoinette Beck" affair: National/New Zealand First MP Michael Laws resigns after being subject to a conflict of interest inquiry over employing a company partly owned by his wife to conduct a poll, signed off by a non-existent "Antoinette Beck".
1996 – Governor General Sir Michael Hardie Boys caused much controversy over openly stating his opposition to Minister of Youth Affairs Deborah Morris's suggestion that young people have access to contraceptives.
1999 – INCIS: The Integrated National Crime Information System, a computer network intended to be used in coordination of police resources, reported to have massive cost over-runs and operational problems.
1999 – New Zealand First MP Tuariki John Delamere is forced to resign as Minister of Immigration after it emerged that he had approved permanent residency for a group of Chinese businessmen provided they invested generously in various Māori development schemes.

2000s
2000 – Dover Samuels resigned as Minister of Maori Affairs pending an investigation into alleged sex crimes he had committed before he entered politics.
2001 – Sir Michael Hardie Boys created a further controversy after making an implied critique of the Clark Labour Government's plan to scrap the air defence wing of the Royal New Zealand Air Force.
2002 – Corngate: an investigation into the alleged release of genetically modified corn, exacerbated by an ambush interview with Prime Minister Helen Clark by broadcaster John Campbell.
2005 – 
June: Graham Capill, former leader of the Christian Heritage Party is convicted on paedophilia-related charges and serves six years in prison. Christian Heritage disbands the following year in the wake of the scandal.
August:  Former ACT Party MP Donna Awatere Huata is convicted on fraud charges involving a trust set up to help underprivileged Maori children.
November: Election funding controversy: during the 2005 New Zealand general election there were widespread allegations of overspending of political electioneering budgets against most major parties, as well as an anonymous hate campaign against the Labour and Green Party by a religious sect, the Exclusive Brethren.
2006 – The Hollow Men, a book by investigative reporter Nicky Hager, reports tactics allegedly used by the National Party in the previous year's elections, much of the information provided from leaked documents.
2007 – New Zealand Labour Party (later New Zealand Pacific Party) MP Taito Philip Field is arrested on corruption and bribery charges. He eventually serves two years in prison.
2009 – National Cabinet Minister Richard Worth resigned after allegations of sexual harassment on his behalf became public. No charges are laid by police.
2009 – Minister for Social Development and Employment Paula Bennett releases the benefit details of two beneficiaries who had criticised the Government's policy of getting rid of the Training Initiative Allowance (TIA), leading to complaints about breaches of privacy which end up being taken to the Privacy Commissioner.
Since late 2000s – Leaky homes crisis: changes to building regulations and practices in the 1990s result in a large number of newer houses being severely susceptible to leaks and mould. Government prevarication on financial recompense leads to major public outrage.

2010s

2010 – 
April: The Government sacks the 14 elected members of Environment Canterbury (Canterbury Regional Council), replacing them with seven appointed commissioners.
September: ACT Party Member David Garrett, the primary party advocate on tougher sentences and ending name suppression in ongoing court cases, admits stealing the identity of a dead infant for the purpose of obtaining a passport 26 years prior. Garrett subsequently resigns.
October: Supreme Court Justice Bill Wilson is forced to stand down after being accused of judicial misconduct.
2011 – 
March - Investigation of sexual assault allegations Made against Darren Hughes. Then Labour Party leader Phil Goff had known of allegations for two weeks before they became public. Hughes resigned, and police later determined there was insufficient evidence to launch a prosecution.
November - Tea tape scandal: A meeting between Prime Minister John Key and ACT Party leader John Banks is recorded by a news journalist. The freedom of the press and the privacy of ostensibly public discussions (the meeting took place in a public area) are widely debated in a case which involves both police and lawyers. Key later settled a defamation claim brought by the journalist involved.
2013 – 
Major problems with payroll system Novopay, used primarily by the New Zealand Department of Education to pay teachers' salaries, causes many teachers to be underpaid, overpaid, or not paid at all for several months. Several other government departments are also affected. It is revealed that the system was approved by the government despite serious technical design flaws revealed during its testing period.
June - United Future leader Peter Dunne resigns as a minister following a leak enquiry over the release of a report about the GCSB. The Inquiry is later subject to the Privileges Committee Inquiry over its methods as the person heading the Inquiry had obtained journalist's records from the Parliamentary Service.
2014 – 
June: ACT Party leader John Banks is convicted of filing a false electoral return in 2010, recording donations known to come from SkyCity Auckland and Kim Dotcom as anonymous. The conviction is overturned on appeal in 2015.
August: National Party cabinet minister Judith Collins is forced to resign her portfolios after being involved in a string of scandals. Early in the year she is accused of a conflict of interest after an overseas trip where she appeared to be promoting milk products produced by Oravida – a New Zealand company of which her husband is a director. Later in the year, claims emerge in Nicky Hager's book Dirty Politics that Collins had passed on private information about public servants to right-wing attack-blogger Cameron Slater. New Zealand First leader Winston Peters also claims in the same month that Collins had approached him to do a post-2014 election deal with National with Collins as leader.
September: The National Party used a song similar to a hit by US rapper Eminem in a campaign ad during that year's election. The song's publishers filed a lawsuit against National for copyright violation stating they did not give consent for the song to be used in a political ad, a claim which National denies.
2015 – 
January: National Party MP Mike Sabin resigns from parliament "due to personal issues that were best dealt with outside Parliament" one month after it is revealed that he is under investigation by police for assault.
May: National cabinet minister Murray McCully is involved in the controversial setting up of a sheep farm in Saudi Arabia in partnership with Saudi businessman Hamood Al-Ali Al-Khalaf, seemingly to negate the risk of Al-Khalaf suing the New Zealand government.
September: Conservative Party leader Colin Craig resigns as party leader amid allegations of sexual harassment of his former secretary. In the messy leadership dispute which follows, Craig is suspended by the party.
2016 –   Colin Craig (see above) cited in court during defamation case taken against him relating to sexual harassment allegations.

2017 – 
June: National MP Todd Barclay is accused of making a clandestine recording of Glenys Dickson, one of his staff, and offering her a hush payment from former Prime Minister John Key's leader's budget. Upon the incident becoming public, Barclay chose to retire from Parliament.
July: Green Party co-leader Metiria Turei reveals that she had at one time committed benefit fraud during the 1990s.
2018 –
August: Minister of Broadcasting, Communications, and Digital Media Clare Curran is dismissed from cabinet after a series of incidents involving secret meetings between herself and Radio New Zealand broadcaster and senior manager Carol Hirschfeld and tech entrepreneur Derek Handley. She resigned as a minister the following month.
October: After a two-month investigation into leaks of information relating to the expenses of National Party leader Simon Bridges, Bridges announced that former Minister of Customs Jami-Lee Ross was the source of the leaks. The following day Ross alleged during a live press conference that Bridges was a corrupt politician who had violated electoral law several times, including accepting an illegal NZ$100,000 donation from Chinese businessman Zhang Yikun. The National Party caucus voted to expel Ross for disloyalty. Ross released an audio recording between himself and Bridges on Facebook. Notably, it included Bridges describing National List MP Maureen Pugh as "fucking useless". On 18 October, a news report was released, with four women accusing Ross of incoherent rages, sexual harassment, and bullying behaviour.
 2019 – A high-up Labour Party staffer is accused of sexually assaulting a 19-year-old party volunteer; Labour Party President Nigel Haworth resigns amidst this scandal.

2020s
2020 – 
January: The Serious Fraud Office filed criminal charges against four people in relation to an alleged NZ$100,000 donation paid into a National Party electorate bank account. Simon Bridges stated neither he nor anyone from National Party are among those who have been charged in relation to the donation allegations. The Serious Fraud Office launched an investigation on 12 March 2019, after police referred on a complaint made by Jami-Lee Ross (see above: October 2018).
July: Minister of Health David Clark is demoted and then resigns as a Minister following repeated alleged breaches of COVID-19 lockdown guidelines.
July: National Party MP Hamish Walker admits to leaking confidential COVID-19 patient information to the press. The information had come to him via former National Party President Michelle Boag, who had received it while acting chief executive of the Auckland Rescue Helicopter trust.

July: National Party MP Andrew Falloon quit politics after sending an indecent image to a young woman. NZ Police subsequently reopened their investigation into Falloon after a number of other women came forward with complaints. 

2022 - 
August:
New National MP Sam Uffindell had historic bullying events as a 16-year-old, which led to his expulsion from King's College, made public. Having offered the victim an apology in 2021 he stood for parliament at the 2022 Tauranga by-election nine months later and declared the event to the National Party selection committee, however it was not mentioned to voters. Soon after another bullying allegation was made against Uffindell by a former flatmate. He was stood down from the National caucus pending an investigation. The investigation, conducted by Maria Dew KC, found that the allegations could not be substantiated and Uffindell was reinstated into the caucus. National's party president, Sylvia Wood, said the investigation would not be released for privacy reasons, but Uffindell's former flatmate who had accused him of bullying and her father said they would agree to a redacted version of the report being publicly released.
Labour MP Gaurav Sharma made several public accusations of bullying in parliament by his own party, their whips and Parliamentary Services revolving around employment issues in his office with staff turnover. Little evidence was provided and his accusations were disputed by Labour and Parliamentary Services. Counterclaims were made by former staffers of Sharma alleging he was bullying them though he stated their contracts were not renewed due to poor performance. For bringing the party into public disrepute Sharma was suspended and later expelled from the Labour caucus.

See also
List of Australian political controversies

Notes

References

 Political
New Zealand
Scandals